Windischleuba is a municipality in the district Altenburger Land, in Thuringia, Germany.

History
Within the German Empire (1871–1918), Windischleuba was part of the Duchy of Saxe-Altenburg.

References

Altenburger Land
Duchy of Saxe-Altenburg